Aria (formerly known as the Lewis Tower Building) is a 33-story Art Deco skyscraper in Center City Philadelphia designed by the firm Edmund Gilchrist.

An exceptionally slender building, it was one of the city's tallest office high-rises until the skyscraper boom of the late 1980s. It housed offices until 2005 when the building was sold for conversion into condominiums, currently The Property is Managed by Madisone Parke (MadisonParke.com)

The building has undergone extensive interior remodeling and exterior renovation (including facade scrubbing and treatment) and has been renamed Aria, a nod to the building's location just off the Avenue of the Arts, Philadelphia's premier performing arts corridor.
The Aria was purchased in 2009 by Richard Oller and Jeffrey Goldstein.

See also
List of tallest buildings in Philadelphia

References

External links
Aria at emporis.com
Lewis Tower Building at Philadelphia Architects and Buildings

Purchased in 2009
Richard Oller
Developed by GoldOller Associates LLC
1608 JFk Philadelphia pa 19102

The Aria was purchased out of bankruptcy by Richard Oller in 2009. Oller a seasoned real estate 
developer. Prior to purchasing the Aria Building Oller was the founder and CEO of The Wentworth Group, The largest property management company in the United States.
The Aria, formally the Lewis Tower Building, was a turn around condo conversion- The sales team which  spearheaded the successful turn around was The Condo Shop a condominium marketing firm. Other successes led by The Condo Shop were the Residences at Two Liberty Place.

Residential skyscrapers in Philadelphia
Art Deco architecture in Pennsylvania